Arthur John Thurman (8 May 1874 – 1900) was an English footballer who played in the Football League for Notts County.

References

1874 births
1900 deaths
English footballers
Association football midfielders
English Football League players
Notts County F.C. players
Footballers from Nottingham